Samuele Levi (1813 – 6 January 1883) was an Italian composer born in Venice. He is best known for his four operas: Iginia d'Asti (1837, Teatro San Benedetto), Ginerva degli Almieri (1840, Teatro Comunale di Trieste), Giuditta (1844, La Fenice), and La biscagliata (1860, Teatro Carignano). He died in Florence.

References

1813 births
1883 deaths
Italian classical composers
Italian male classical composers
Italian opera composers
Male opera composers
Musicians from Venice
19th-century classical composers
19th-century Italian composers
19th-century Italian male musicians